Juan Carlos Gómez Díaz (born 6 April 1973), known as Juan Carlos, is a Spanish retired footballer who played as a forward. He is currently the manager of Xerez CD.

Playing career
Born in Córdoba, Andalusia, Carlos made his senior debut with Córdoba CF's reserves in 1991. In 1993, after playing for the first team in Segunda División B, he moved to another reserve team in the same division, Atlético Madrid B.

After scoring a career-best twenty-one goals during the season, Carlos was loaned for one year in July 1994 to Segunda División side CA Marbella. He made his debut in the category on 4 September of that year by starting in a 1–3 away loss against Hércules CF. He scored his first goal fourteen days later in a 4–1 away routing of CD Badajoz.

After scoring eleven goals for Marbella, Carlos returned to Atleti in July 1995, and was subsequently assigned to the first team in La Liga the following January. He made his top-tier debut on 6 January 1996, starting and scoring his team's first in a 3–1 home win against CD Tenerife.

Mainly a backup to Lyuboslav Penev and Kiko during his spell, Carlos was featured sparingly before moving to fellow league team Real Valladolid in 1997. In the following year, after struggling with injuries, he joined Sevilla FC in the second level.

Carlos was an ever-present figure for the club during his two-season stint, achieving top tier promotion as champions but suffering immediate relegation. He spent the remainder of his career in the second level but impaired from his injuries; he represented Atlético Madrid, Getafe CF and Elche CF. He had trials with third level side CD Villanueva, but nothing came of them.

Carlos retired in 2007, aged 34, after playing for Lucena CF in Tercera División.

Managerial career
Carlos began his managerial career in 2012 with the regional leagues of CD Ciudad Jardín. In February 2015, after more than a year without a club, he took over CD Mairena in the fourth level.

On 17 July 2015, Carlos was appointed manager of Écija Balompié, also in the fourth division.

In July 2019, he became the new manager of Xerez CD in the Tercera División.

Honors

Player
Atlético Madrid
La Liga: 1995–96
Copa del Rey: 1995–96
Segunda División: 2001–02

References

External links

1973 births
Living people
Footballers from Córdoba, Spain
Spanish footballers
Association football forwards
La Liga players
Segunda División players
Segunda División B players
Tercera División players
Córdoba CF B players
Córdoba CF players
Atlético Madrid B players
CA Marbella footballers
Atlético Madrid footballers
Real Valladolid players
Sevilla FC players
Getafe CF footballers
Elche CF players
Lucena CF players
Spanish football managers
Segunda División B managers
Segunda Federación managers
Tercera División managers
Tercera Federación managers
Écija Balompié managers
Xerez CD managers